Sabrina Filzmoser (born 12 June 1980 in Wels) is a retired Austrian judoka. She is a two-time bronze medalist at the World Judo Championships and she has also won medals, including two golds, in her event at the European Judo Championships. She competed at the 2008, 2012, 2016, and 2020 Summer Olympics.

References

External links

 
 

1980 births
Living people
Austrian female judoka
Olympic judoka of Austria
Judoka at the 2008 Summer Olympics
Judoka at the 2012 Summer Olympics
Judoka at the 2016 Summer Olympics
People from Wels
Judoka at the 2015 European Games
Judoka at the 2019 European Games
European Games medalists in judo
European Games bronze medalists for Austria
Sportspeople from Upper Austria
Judoka at the 2020 Summer Olympics
21st-century Austrian women